The Jamaica national under-23 football team   (also known as Jamaica under-23, Jamaica U23) represents Jamaica in international football competitions during and Pan American Games. The selection is limited to players under the age of 23, The team is controlled by the Jamaica Football Federation (JFF).  eam took part in preliminary matches, it has never qualified for the final stages of an Olympic football tournament.

Results and fixtures

Legend

2021

Players

Current squad
The following players were named to the squad for the international friendly match against  on 12 June 2021.

Caps and goals accurate up to and including 28 May 2021.

(Players are listed within position group by kit number, order of caps, then alphabetically)

Competitive record

Olympic Games

See also
Sport in Jamaica
Football in Jamaica
Women's football in Jamaica
Jamaica national football team
Jamaica national under-20 football team
Jamaica national under-17 football team
Jamaica national beach soccer team
Jamaica women's national football team

References

External links
Jamaican Football Federation (JFF)  
Jamaica profile at FIFA.com

Football in Jamaica